Hui is a surname. It is the Hanyu Pinyin spelling of two Chinese surnames ( and ), as well as a variant spelling of two others ( Xǔ and  Fèi).

Origins

Surname Huì (惠)

The Chinese character used to write this surname means "favour" or "benefit". It is the 204th surname in the traditional poem Hundred Family Surnames. The Mingxian Shizu Yanxing Leigao section of the Siku Quanshu encyclopedia states that this surname was adopted from the posthumous name of King Hui of Zhou (676–651 BC). The descendants who adopted the surname settled in Jiangsu and Zhejiang provinces. During the Qing Dynasty, some Manchu people also adopted this surname.

In Sino-Korean pronunciation, this character is read Hye. It is not used as a surname in modern Korea, but can be found as an element of Korean given names. In Sino-Vietnamese pronunciation, it is read Huệ.

Surname Huí (回)
The Chinese character used to write this surname means "return". It does not appear in Hundred Family Surnames.

 It was originally the personal name of Fang Hui, an official who served under Emperor Yao
 It was originally the personal name of Wu Hui, a son of the legendary Zhurong. Wu Hui's son Sun later took Hui as his surname.
 It is found as a surname among the Hui people (whose ethnonym is written with the same character). However, the sources do not explain its origin.

In Sino-Korean pronunciation, this character is read Hoe. It is not used as a surname in modern Korea, and only rarely as an element of given names. In Sino-Vietnamese pronunciation, it is read Hồi.

Other
Hui may be the spelling of two other Chinese surnames, based on their pronunciation in different varieties of Chinese; they are listed below by their spelling in Hanyu Pinyin, which reflects the Mandarin Chinese pronunciation:
Xǔ, spelled Hui based on its Cantonese pronunciation
Fèi, spelled Hui based on its pronunciation in various Southern Min dialects, e.g. Teochew

Statistics
According to reports in 2014, the surname Huì meaning "favour" was the 262nd-most-common surname in mainland China. It had roughly 298,000 bearers, primarily in Shaanxi, Henan, Shandong, and Jiangsu.

According to statistics cited by Patrick Hanks, there were 581 people on the island of Great Britain and 34 on the island of Ireland with the surname Hui as of 2011. There were no people with the surname on the island of Great Britain in 1881.

The 2010 United States Census found 5,768 people with the surname Hui, making it the 5,966th-most-common name in the country. This represented an increase from 5,282 (6,003rd-most-common) in the 2000 Census. In both censuses, more than nine-tenths of the bearers of the surname identified as Asian. It was the 228th-most-common surname among respondents to the 2000 Census who identified as Asian.

People

Surname Huì (惠)
Hui Shi (370–310 BCE), Chinese philosopher
Hui Yuyu (1909–1989), Chinese politician, delegate to the first through third National People's Congresses
Kara Hui (born 1960), Hong Kong actress
Hui Jun (born 1963), Chinese table tennis player
Cang Hui (born 1977), Chinese mathematician in South Africa
Hui Zicheng (born 1989), Chinese sports shooter
Hui Jiakang (born 1989), Chinese football midfielder
Hui Ruoqi (born 1991), Chinese volleyball player
Hui Xirui (born 1994), Chinese badminton player

Surname Huí (回)
Hui Liangyu (born 1944), Chinese politician, vice-premier from 2003 to 2013

Surname Xǔ (許)
Michael Hui (born 1942), Hong Kong comedian
Ann Hui (born 1947), Hong Kong film director
Rafael Hui (born 1948), Hong Kong government official, Chief Secretary for Administration (2005–2007)
Sam Hui (born 1948), Hong Kong singer
Hui Shiu-hung (born 1948), Hong Kong actor
Herman Hui (born 1951), Hong Kong businessman and Scout Movement member
Hui Lin Chit (born ), Chinese businessman who co-founded Hengan International
Lap Shun Hui (born 1951), Chinese-born American technology entrepreneur
Hui So Hung (born 1958), Hong Kong table tennis player
Raman Hui (born 1963), Hong Kong animator and film director
Steve Hui Chun-tak (born 1963), Hong Kong Police Force spokesman
Vico Hui (born ), Hong Kong businessman and former Birmingham City F.C. chairman
Andy Hui (born 1967), Hong Kong singer
Hui Chak Bor (born 1968), Hong Kong cyclist
Florence Hui (born 1974), Hong Kong government official,  Undersecretary for Home Affairs (2008–2017)
Christopher Hui (born 1976), Hong Kong government official, Secretary for Financial Services and the Treasury since 2020
John Hui (tennis) (born 1978), Hong Kong tennis player
Ted Hui (born 1982), Hong Kong Democratic Party politician
Alfred Hui (born 1988), Hong Kong singer
Jack Hui (born 1988), Hong Kong mathematics student
Hui Ka Lok (born 1994), Hong Kong football winger
Hui Wang Fung (born 1994), Hong Kong football forward
Hui Chiu-yin, Hong Kong businessman, director of First Ferry

Other or unknown
Ka Kwong Hui (1922–2003), Chinese-born American potter and ceramist
Roger Hui (born 1953), Hong Kong-born Canadian computer scientist
Hui Cheong (born 1956), Hong Kong sprint canoer
Melissa Hui (born 1966), Hong Kong-born Canadian composer
Vatau Hui (born 1970), Tongan politician
Alexandra Hui (born 1980), American historian of science and sound
Phil Hui (born 1987), American poker player
Justin Hui (born 1998), Singaporean footballer

References

Chinese-language surnames
Multiple Chinese surnames